Heman Edward Drummond (August 8, 1905– April 5, 1956) was an American businessman from Alabama. He was the founder of the Drummond Company, a coal-mining company.

Early life
Heman Edward Drummond was born on August 8, 1905. His grandfather was a landowner in Alabama. His mother was a homesteader.

Career
Drummond worked as a coal miner for the Debardeleben Coal Company, founded by Henry T. DeBardeleben.

In 1935, Drummond took a $300 loan from a bank in rural Alabama and founded a coal-mining concern which became known as the Drummond Company. Drummond started coal-mining on the land he had inherited from his grandfather and his mother in Jasper, Alabama. He used mules to drag coal out of mines. He first sold the coal to neighbors, farms and homesteads in the area.

Personal life
Drummond married Elza Eliza Stewart. They had five sons, Donald, Segal, Garry, Larry and John, and two daughters, Hila Jo Drummond Davidson, Barbara Drummond Thorne.

Death and legacy
He died on April 5, 1956. He was buried at the Pisgah Baptist Church and Cemetery in Sipsey, Alabama. One of his sons, Garry N. Drummond, served as the chairman and chief executive officer of the Drummond Company. It has grown into a large global corporation.

References

External links

1905 births
1956 deaths
People from Walker County, Alabama
American company founders
American businesspeople in the coal industry
20th-century American businesspeople
Businesspeople from Alabama
Drummond family (Alabama)